Lewis Moore Ward (born 5 March 1997) is an English professional footballer who last played as a goalkeeper for EFL League Two side Sutton United.

Career

Reading
Ward began his career with Reading, and has a youth loan with Portsmouth during the 2012–13 season.

He joined Whitehawk on loan on 10 October 2014, in a deal that lasted until 7 November 2014. He made two FA Cup appearances, conceding four goals in each game.

On 5 May 2016, Ward joined Icelandic Úrvalsdeild side Fylkir on loan until 26 June 2016.

Ward signed on loan for Margate in August 2016, before having two spells with Hungerford Town, the second beginning in August 2017.

Ward moved on loan to Aldershot Town in November 2017, originally until January 2018, but this was later extended until the end of the season. Aldershot made it to the play-offs, losing out to Ebbsfleet United after a penalty shoot out. Initially Aldershot went ahead 3–1 on penalties due to two saves by Ward, however Ward himself hit the post with the deciding penalty.

On 22 June 2018, Ward signed a new contract with Reading, keeping him at the club until the summer of 2020.

Ward joined Northampton Town on a season-long loan on 27 July 2018. He made his professional debut on 14 August 2018, in the EFL Cup, and made four further appearances in the EFL Trophy. On 14 January 2019, Reading announced that Ward's loan with Northampton Town had ended early, and that he would join Forest Green Rovers on loan for the remainder of the season.

Exeter City
On 20 June 2019, Ward signed for Exeter City on a two-year contract for an undisclosed fee. On 5 October 2019, Ward suffered a broken arm in a League Two fixture against Crewe Alexandra. The injury came in the 86th minute, and Ward continued until the end of the match.

He was replaced in the starting XI by Jonny Maxted, but returned to the lineup in February 2020 when Maxted suffered an injury in the pre-match warmup away at Swindon Town, by which time Ward had recovered to match fitness.

In January 2021 he moved on loan to Portsmouth.

On 12 May 2021 it was announced that he would leave Exeter at the end of the season, following the expiry of his contract.

Swindon Town
On 27 July 2021, Ward signed for Swindon Town on a one-year contract following a trial. He made his league debut at Forest Green Rovers on 9 October 2021, keeping a clean sheet and saving a penalty.

Sutton United
He transferred to Sutton United on 1 September 2022 for an undisclosed fee. His contact was mutual terminated on 31 January 2023.

Personal life
Ward has obtained a degree in Sports Journalism from the University of Staffordshire.

Career statistics

References

1997 births
Living people
English footballers
Reading F.C. players
Portsmouth F.C. players
Whitehawk F.C. players
Sutton United F.C. players
Lewis Ward
Margate F.C. players
Hungerford Town F.C. players
Aldershot Town F.C. players
Northampton Town F.C. players
Forest Green Rovers F.C. players
Exeter City F.C. players
Association football goalkeepers
Lewis Ward
National League (English football) players
English expatriate footballers
English expatriate sportspeople in Iceland
Expatriate footballers in Iceland
Alumni of Staffordshire University
English Football League players
Swindon Town F.C. players